Ragnarok DS, known in Japan as , is a Nintendo DS video game based on the MMORPG Ragnarok Online and was released in Japan on December 18, 2008. It was announced that publisher Xseed Games had teamed up with developer GungHo Online Entertainment to bring the game to North America on February 16, 2010. It had also been announced that it would be released in South Korea.

GungHo Online Entertainment, the company that hosts the Japanese server of Ragnarok Online, announced it would expand its business for video game consoles; Ragnarok DS is the sixth of eight games for DS to be released by them, along with 'Love Revo!! DS, Indo Shiki Keisan Drill DS, Aqua Zone DS, 100 Kiri Golf DS, Hero's Saga Laevatein Tactics, Minna de Jibun no Setsumeisho: B-Kata, A-Kata, AB-Kata, O-Kata and Ecolis: Aoi Umi to Ugoku Shima.

Gameplay
The massively multiplayer features of the original are not present in this version, but will support up to three players simultaneously in a variety of multi-player dungeons.

Two new possibly exclusive classes are released alongside this game: Dark Knight (which may be related to the unreleased Death Knight class in the MMORPG counterpart) and Shaman.

The game follows the plights of the main character Ales as he ventures out in the world to form a guild after the death of his mother.  Ales' father, who was also an adventurer, has been missing for several years and Ales blames him for not being present to take care of her.  Along his way to fame and fortune several characters are introduced and join Ales in completing specific tasks, usually resulting in permanent companionship.  After completing the main storyline to a point a guild will be formed and access is gained to storage, new recruit characters and the option to edit what characters are currently in the player's party.

The mirage tower, a 50 floor dungeon consisting of a boss character every 5 levels is a single or multiplayer challenge and contains the most valuable items in the game.  After beating a boss characters will be presented with a bidding screen to determine loot distribution and a base experience and job experience award will be doled out to each participant.  Monsters inside the tower themselves do not offer any experience.  Computer controlled allies are unable to enter the dungeon, so single player attempts will consist of just the player character.  The main characters hair color and hair style as well as gender can be altered for play in the tower with each boss unlocking more hair styles and colors.

The game is designed to be almost entirely controlled by the DS stylus for simplicity and ease of use. Additionally, the game is designed to follow a quest based story line with the options of side-quest to gain access to additional rewards. Only one side-quest can be accepted at a time despite the fact that multiple side-quests are available for each area. Players who want to accomplish more side-quests will have to visit the same areas multiple times.

Reception

The game received "mixed" reviews according to the review aggregation website Metacritic.  In Japan, Famitsu'' gave it a score of all four sevens for a total of 28 out of 40.

References

External links

 

2008 video games
Nintendo DS games
Nintendo DS-only games
Ragnarok Online
Role-playing video games
Multiplayer and single-player video games
Video games developed in Japan
Xseed Games games